The 1968 New Hampshire gubernatorial election was held on November 5, 1968.

Incumbent Democratic Governor John W. King retired to run for the U.S. Senate.

Republican nominee Walter R. Peterson Jr. defeated Democratic nominee Emile R. Bussiere with 52.53% of the vote.

Primary elections
Primary elections were held on September 10, 1968.

Democratic primary

Candidates
Emile R. Bussiere, State's attorney for Hillsborough County
Vincent P. Dunn, New Hampshire Bank Commissioner
Austin F. Quinney, former member of the Executive Council
John D. Shea, former State Representative
Henry P. Sullivan, State Senator

Results

Republican primary

Candidates
Elmer E. Bussey, perennial candidate
Edward H. Cullen, member of the Executive Council
Fred Fletcher, member of the Executive Council
Stuart Hancock, former State Representative
Walter R. Peterson Jr., Speaker of the New Hampshire House of Representatives
Wesley Powell, former Governor
Meldrim Thomson Jr., publisher

Results

General election

Candidates
Emile R. Bussiere, Democratic
Walter R. Peterson Jr., Republican

Results

References

Bibliography
 
 
 

1968
New Hampshire
Gubernatorial
November 1968 events in the United States